The article lists major cities in Kerala based on the total area coming under the jurisdiction of city corporations/municipalities. This list is based on the 2011 Census of India.

**Note:-
 The figures mentioned in the article are only based on the area coming under the jurisdiction of corporations & municipalities. It has no relation with the metro areas.

See also

 List of cities in India by area
 List of states and union territories of India by area

References

Lists of cities in Kerala
Kerala
Indian superlatives
4. https://en.m.wikipedia.org/wiki/Kozhikode_Municipal_Corporation